Thomas Alfred Broome (14 January 1892 – 5 September 1956) was an English professional footballer who played as a wing half.

References

1892 births
1956 deaths
English footballers
Association football wing halves
Salford United F.C. players
Rochdale A.F.C. players
Preston North End F.C. players
Grimsby Town F.C. players
Nelson F.C. players
Chesterfield F.C. players
Great Harwood F.C. players
Sandbach Ramblers F.C. players
CWS Balloon Street F.C. players
English Football League players